MTV Unplugged is the second live album by Canadian singer and songwriter Shawn Mendes. The album was recorded at The Theatre at Ace Hotel, Los Angeles in September 2017. The album was released worldwide on November 3, 2017.

Commercial performance
MTV Unplugged debuted at number 71 in the United States with 9,000 units; 3,000 of which were traditional album sales.

Track listing

Personnel 
Credits adapted from the album's liner notes.

Musicians
 Wynton Grant – violin 
 Dave Haskett – bass 
 Patrick Laird – cello 
 Shawn Mendes – vocals , acoustic guitar , electric guitar , piano 
 Cicely Parnas – cello 
 Eddy Ruyter – piano , keyboards 
 Mike Sleath – drums 
 Zubin Thakkar – guitar 
 Geoff Warburton – electric guitar , acoustic guitar 

Production
 J. Mark King – engineer 
 Cody Robertson – assistant mixing
 George Seara – mixing
 Zubin Thakkar – producer, engineer

Charts

Release history

References 

2017 live albums
Shawn Mendes albums
Island Records albums
Mtv Unplugged (Mendes, Shawn album)
Universal Records albums